Margie Bright Matthews (born February 10, 1963) is a Democratic member of the South Carolina Senate, representing the 45th District since 2015, when she won a special election to succeed Clementa Pinckney, who was killed in the Charleston church shooting in 2015.  She is an attorney.

Bright Matthews was among a number of African American women from around the United States who endorsed Hillary Rodham Clinton for President in 2016.

References

1963 births
Living people
African-American state legislators in South Carolina
Democratic Party South Carolina state senators
21st-century American politicians
People from Walterboro, South Carolina
21st-century African-American politicians
20th-century African-American people

Women state legislators in South Carolina
Women in the South Carolina State Senate